Oreo is a genus of Australian araneomorph spiders in the family Trachycosmidae, and was first described by Norman I. Platnick in 2002. The name derives from the Oreo cookie. The type species has a black and white abdomen, although such coloration is common among gallieniellids.

Species
 it contains five species:
Oreo bushbay Platnick, 2002 – Australia (Western Australia)
Oreo capensis Platnick, 2002 – Australia (Western Australia)
Oreo kidman Platnick, 2002 – Australia (Northern Territory)
Oreo muncoonie Platnick, 2002 – Australia (Queensland)
Oreo renmark Platnick, 2002 (type) – Australia (South Australia, Queensland to Victoria)

References

Araneomorphae genera
Gallieniellidae